Stylogaster neglecta is a species of thick-headed flies (insects in the family Conopidae).

References

Conopidae
Articles created by Qbugbot
Insects described in 1883